Forkhead box I1 is a protein that in humans is encoded by the FOXI1 gene.

This gene belongs to the forkhead family of transcription factors which is characterized by a distinct forkhead domain. The specific function of this gene has not yet been determined; however, it is possible that this gene plays an important role in the development of the cochlea and vestibulum, as well as embryogenesis. wo transcript variants encoding different isoforms have been found for this gene.

Clinical significance 

Mutations in this gene are associated with enlarged vestibular aqueduct.

See also 
 FOX proteins

References

Further reading

External links 
  GeneReviews/NCBI/NIH/UW entry on Pendred Syndrome/DFNB4

Forkhead transcription factors